Edgard Leuenroth (October 31, 1881 – September 28, 1968) was a Brazilian journalist, publisher and writer, who became famous for his documentation of the country's earliest social movements, particularly the communist, socialist and anarchist worker's and intellectual's activities and movements.

External links

 Edgard Leuenroth Page from the Anarchist Encyclopedia

1881 births
1968 deaths
Brazilian journalists
Brazilian male writers
Brazilian people of German descent
Brazilian anarchists
20th-century journalists
Print journalists
People from Mogi Mirim